Rodrigo Sobral Rollemberg (born July 13, 1959) is a Brazilian politician and member of the Brazilian Socialist Party (PSB). He served as Governor of the Federal District from 2015 to 2019.

Rollemberg won the 2014 Federal District gubernatorial election on October 5, 2014, with 812,036 votes, or 55.56% of the vote. He defeated the Party of the Republic (PR) gubernatorial candidate, Jofran Frejat, who placed second with 649,587 votes, or 44.44%.

Following his election victory, Rollemberg pledged to hold the government of the Federal District more accountable. He also promised to create a "accountability council," composed of civic leaders and private citizens. Rollemberg took office on January 1, 2015, succeeding outgoing Governor Agnelo Queiroz.

References

Living people
1959 births
Governors of the Federal District (Brazil)
Members of the Federal Senate (Brazil)
Members of the Chamber of Deputies (Brazil) from the Federal District
Brazilian Socialist Party politicians
University of Brasília alumni
People from Rio de Janeiro (city)